Iolaus newporti, the Newport's sapphire, is a butterfly in the family Lycaenidae. It is found in western Nigeria. The habitat consists of dry savanna.

Adults are on wing in April and May.

References

Butterflies described in 1994
Iolaus (butterfly)
Endemic fauna of Nigeria
Butterflies of Africa